Union Giesserei (German: Union Gießerei) was a German engineering company based in Königsberg, East Prussia.

History

The families of Laubmeyer, Dultz and Schnell founded an iron foundry in Königsberg on 1 May 1828, that was given the name of Union Giesserei in 1845. On 1 April 1846 Johann Gottfried Dietrich Wilhelm Ostendorff (5 April 1812 - 23 September 1876) took over the running of Union Giesserei, and the manufacture of steam engines and boilers was started. On 5 December 1855, Union-Giesserei celebrated the delivery of its first steam locomotive, built for the Prussian Eastern Railway. On  Ostendorff's death in 1876, Elias Radok (16 November 1840 - 30 March 1910), who had previously worked for A. Borsig in Berlin, took over the firm. It was changed from a public trading company to a public limited company on 2 June 1881. The board was now run by E. Radok and Ostendorff's son, Arthur, (18 May 1850 - 24 July 1891). When Elias Radok died, the factory was taken over by senior engineers, Georg Panck and Paul Fischer, together with the master builder, Max Hartung. Paul Fischer left in 1920 due to illness, Georg Panck died in 1923 and Max Hartung took over the helm until the arrival of Dr. Paul Brehm in November 1925.

Union Giesserei did not get any contracts from the newly formed Deutsche Reichsbahn and negotiations with the Reichsbahn proved largely fruitless. This led to severe economic problems in the company during the mid-1920s. In 1927, however, Union Giesserei was finally given orders for the construction of the DRG Class 64 and 80 steam locomotives as part of the 'eastern regions aid' (Ostlandhilfe) scheme. From 17 March 1930 it became a subsidiary of the F. Schichau GmbH, which took over Union Giesserei completely in 1931.

Sources 
Union-Giesserei: "100 Jahre Union-Giesser Königsberg Pr. 1828-1928", Festschrift zum 100jährigen Bestehen

Companies of Prussia
Königsberg
Defunct locomotive manufacturers of Germany